Monomorium noualhieri is a species of ant endemic to Algeria.

References

Insects of North Africa
noualhieri
Hymenoptera of Africa
Insects described in 1895
Endemic fauna of Algeria
Taxonomy articles created by Polbot